Kuniuraman Kannan (sometimes spelt Kunjuraman Kannan), more popularly known as K. Kannan, is a Singaporean football forward who played for Singapore. He was in the Singapore squad in the 1984 Asian Cup. He also played for Jurong Town. He was known for always missing the goal and blasting his shots over the crossbar.

Career 
In the Malaysia Cup tournament, Kannan has played for Singapore FA (debuting in 1981) and Kuala Lumpur FA.

Kannan was named the Player of the Year in FAS Premier League 1992 season while playing for Geylang International. He then signed a record  contract to play for Changi United.

Match-fixing 
Following widespread rumours about corruption within the sports among the teams who played in the Malaysia Premier League (MPL), the Corrupt Practices Investigation Bureau (CPIB) launched an investigation and had interviewed multiple players, including Kannan. On 24 October 1994, Kannan and Changi United Club manager Ong Kheng Hock was arrested for match fixing at the recent MPL season. On instructions from a businessman, Rajendran R. Kupusamy. They were faced three charges for allegedly trying to fix two MPL matches by bribing goalkeeper David Lee as while as receiving rewards for their actions. In the first match against Perlis, Lee was offered  and he was to help reduce the winning margins by Singapore. Singapore won 2-1 in that match. In the second match against, Selangor, Lee was offered  to ensure that the game would end up in a draw. Singapore won 3-1 in that match instead. Lee was not charged with any crimes. 

Rejendran was named as the witness in this case. In the seven-day long trial, Lee testified that he was not aware of the matching fixing plans. Kannan and Ong was found guilty of conspiring and bribery, and were jailed and fined. Football Association of Singapore also had banned Kannan, and other players involved in corruption and match-fixing for life from the sports.

Over the years, Kannan would file five appeals to the FAS, appealing to them to remove the ban against him. However, they were largely unsuccessful until in 2022 when FAS decided to lift the ban after reviewing his fifth attempt. One of his release conditions was to participate in anti-corruption drives and engagements for six months from when the ban was lifted.

Personal life 
Kannan is married with 3 children.

References

Singaporean footballers
Singapore international footballers
Living people
Singaporean people of Tamil descent
Singaporean sportspeople of Indian descent
Singapore FA players
Kuala Lumpur City F.C. players
Geylang International FC players
1984 AFC Asian Cup players
Jurong FC players
Southeast Asian Games silver medalists for Singapore
Southeast Asian Games medalists in football
Association football forwards
Year of birth missing (living people)
Competitors at the 1983 Southeast Asian Games